Acrolepiopsis issikiella is a moth of the family Acrolepiidae. It was described by Sigeru Moriuti in 1961. It is found in Japan.

The wingspan is 11–12 mm. There are several generations per year. The adults emerge in autumn and overwinter.

The larvae feed on seeds in a capsule of Dioscorea species, but have also been recorded tunneling the stems, or feeding on the leaves of Dioscorea tokoro. Larvae can be found from summer to mid-autumn.

References

Moths described in 1961
Acrolepiidae
Moths of Japan